Skoryky may refer to:
 Skoryky, Kharkiv Oblast, village in Ukraine
 Skoryky, Ternopil Oblast, village in Ukraine